Linda Yellen is an American director, producer and writer of film and television, (born in New York City).

As a producer some of her credits are Playing for Time (1980), The Royal Romance of Charles and Diana (1982) and Second Serve (1986).
 
Some of her credits as a director include Northern Lights (1997), The Simian Line (2001), William & Catherine: A Royal Romance (2011) and The Last Film Festival (2011) which stars Dennis Hopper in his final acting role. "BLUSH" (2014) The untold story of a love triangle between Greta Garbo, Marlene Dietrich and Mercedes De Acosta  
She is the producer/writer of "Skinny and Cat" (2014) 

Linda's projects have received 2 Peabodys, 7 Emmys, including a Primetime Emmy Award as a producer for Playing for Time in 1981, 1 Silver Nymph and 2 Christophers. She is an alumna of Barnard College and Columbia University.
Linda's films have been shown at Cannes, Sundance , New York, Hamptons, Monte Carlo, Aspen, Banff, Palm Springs, Nashville, Santa Fe International, and Deauville Film Festivals. Additionally, Linda's projects have been nominated for a Golden Globe and a Writers Guild Award.

Filmography

References

External links

1949 births
Living people
Film producers from New York (state)
Screenwriters from New York (state)
American television directors
Television producers from New York City
American women television producers
American television writers
Barnard College alumni
Emmy Award winners
American women film directors
American women television directors
American women screenwriters
American women television writers
Writers from New York City
Film directors from New York City
American women film producers
21st-century American women